Stolarska Street (Polish: Ulica Stolarska, lit. Carpenters Street) - a historic street in Kraków, Poland. The street extends southwards from Mały Rynek to Dominikańska Street (Ulica Dominikańska). The oldest recorded name of the street is platea fratrum Praedicatorum (relating to the existence of the Holy Trinity Basilica at the southern point of the street), from 1305. The present name was first recorded in 1542. The curve in the street is a result of a dwelling prior to Kraków receiving its city rights in 1257 laying in its transcent.

The street features the consulates of France, Germany and the United States of America.

The street is part of the Lesser Polish Way of Saint James from Sandomierz to Tyniec.

Features

References

Streets in Kraków